Mahabad River is an endorheic river in Mahabad county Iran, located at 36°46′03″N 45°42′06″E and which flows into the southern end of Lake Urmia.

The river has been crossed by the Mahabad Dam near the city of Mahabad, West Azerbaijan province.

References

Rivers of West Azerbaijan Province
Landforms of West Azerbaijan Province
Iranian Kurdistan